Sophie Suzan Thembekwayo is a South African politician and a member of parliament for the Economic Freedom Fighters (EFF). She was appointed to parliament in January 2017, replacing Hlayiseka Chewane. Thembekwayo was elected to a full term as a parliamentarian in 2019.

References

External links
Dr Sophie Suzan Thembekwayo at Parliament of South Africa

Living people
Year of birth missing (living people)
Place of birth missing (living people)
Economic Freedom Fighters politicians
Members of the National Assembly of South Africa
Women members of the National Assembly of South Africa